Perfectly Preserved is the second studio album by American Christian metal band Love and Death. The album was released on February 12, 2021 through Earache Records. This is the band's first album with current Breaking Benjamin and former Red guitarist Jasen Rauch on bass and Phinehas drummer Isaiah Perez.

Background and release
Love and Death's debut album, Between Here & Lost, was released on January 22, 2013 through Tooth & Nail Records. Later that year Welch would rejoin his former band Korn and recorded his first album with that band in ten years, The Paradigm Shift. Love and Death would have sporadic activity over the next few years as Welch focused on his work with Korn. The band released the single "Lo Lamento" on March 15, 2016. Bassist Michael Valentine and drummer Dan Johnson would depart the band shortly after the single's release.

After the release of "Lo Lamento," Love and Death became inactive once again. In August 2019, Welch announced he was recruiting musicians such as Jasen Rauch and Lacey Sturm to appear on an album. The band announced on October 24, 2020 that it had signed with Earache Records and that a new album was planned to be released in 2021. The single "Down" was released on November 13, 2020 and introduced the band's new lineup. The song "White Flag" was released as a 3rd single on January 8, 2021. The song "The Hunter" was released as a 4th single on February 5, 2021.

Before the album's release, Welch stated that work on the album was able to move forward as the musicians' main projects were on hold due to the COVID-19 pandemic.

Perfectly Preserved was released on February 12, 2021.

Reception

Perfectly Preserved received generally positive reviews upon release.

Metal Hammers Sophie Maughan praised JR Bareis's clean vocals, saying that they sound "a lot more confident this time" along with Welch's harsh vocals. Maughan also praised the band's ability to "incorporate personal beliefs amongst huge, punchy hooks and pummelling riffs without coming across as overly preachy."

Jesus Freak Hideout's Michael Weaver praised the album, highlighting JR Bareis's increased involvement on the album, calling it a "wise choice" and gives the album a more youthful perspective that makes it more accessible. He stated that the album's more accessible sound doesn't come off as a negative and feels like a logical progression from Between Here and Lost. Weaver also praised the cover of "Let Me Love You," calling it a "great melodic rock song." Wall of Sound'''s Ricky Aarons also praised the album, saying the album will "go down in history as something really special."

A more mixed review came from James Hickie of Kerrang!, who said the album is more of the same from the band and called the cover of "Let Me Love You" a "novelty blip." Hickie did praise the album's heavier moments and Welch's vocals.

In April 2021, the album was included on Metal Hammers list of "The Top 20 Best Albums of 2021 so Far." Perfectly Preserved was selected as the seventh best alternative metal album of 2021 by Metal Hammer''.

Track listing

Personnel
Love and Death
Brian "Head" Welch – lead vocals, guitar
Gary "JR" Bareis – guitar, backing vocals on "The Hunter", co-lead vocals (1-6, 8-10), programming
Jasen Rauch – guitar, bass, programming
Isaiah Perez – drums

additional musicians
 Joe Rickard – programming
 Keith Wallen – lead vocals on "The Hunter", programming, additional vocals
 Tom Hane – programming
 Lacey Sturm – vocals on "Let Me Love You"
 Ryan Hayes – vocals on "White Flag"
 Jennea Welch – performing in "Slow Fire"

References

2021 albums
Love and Death (band) albums
Earache Records albums